Mark S. Kamlet is an American political scientist currently the University Professor of Economics and Public Policy at Heinz College, Carnegie Mellon University and an Elected Fellow of the American Association for the Advancement of Science.

References

Fellows of the American Association for the Advancement of Science
Carnegie Mellon University faculty
American political scientists
Stanford University alumni
Living people
University of California, Berkeley alumni
Year of birth missing (living people)